Zarathustra is a progressive rock album released in 1973 by the Italian band Museo Rosenbach. It is generally regarded as one of the best Italian progressive rock works of all time.

Controversially, the lyrics compose a concept album of Friedrich Nietzsche's philosophy, particularly his 1883–1885 novel Thus Spoke Zarathustra. The song titles translate into "The Last Man", "The King of Yesterday", "Beyond Good and Evil", "Übermensch", "The Temple of Hourglasses", "Of Man", "Of Nature", and "Of the Eternal Return".

The music has been edited by bassist Alberto Moreno, texts from external collaborator Mauro La Luce. Side A is completely occupied by the long suite Zarathustra, side B includes the remaining three songs, which relate thematically to the first part by the expression of the concept album, so dear to progressive rock groups.

The album was a commercial failure mainly because of the boycott of RAI, which was suspicious of the group because of the themes (the quote from Nietzsche could supposedly refer to ideologies of the far-right) and the bust of Mussolini pictured in the collage on the cover, work of the illustrator Caesar Monti.

The singer, Stefano Galifi, later joined an art rock band named  ("The Temple of Hourglasses"), quoting the title of the track.

Track listing
 Side one
 "Zarathustra" - 20:31
 "Zarathustra: L'Ultimo Uomo" – 3:55
 "Zarathustra: Il Re di Ieri" – 4:40
 "Zarathustra: Al di Là del Bene e del Male" – 2:39
 "Zarathustra: Superuomo" – 6:25
 "Zarathustra: Il Tempio delle Clessidre" – 2:52
 Side two
 "Degli Uomini" – 4:04
 "Della Natura" – 8:28
 "Dell'Eterno Ritorno" – 6:18

Personnel
 Giancarlo Golzi – drums, percussion, vocals
 Alberto Moreno – bass and piano
 Enzo Merogno – guitar, vocals
 Pit Corradi – mellotron, Hammond organ, vibraphone, Farfisa electric piano
 Stefano Galifi – vocals

Sources
 "Museo Rosenbach Zarathustra" at www.progreviews.com.

1973 albums
Adaptations of works by Friedrich Nietzsche
Thus Spoke Zarathustra